Alexander David Sears (born 17 December 1989) is an English former first-class cricketer.

Sears was born at Grantham in December 1989. He was educated at The King's School in Grantham, before going up to Homerton College, Cambridge. While studying at Cambridge, he made a single appearance in first-class cricket for Cambridge University Cricket Club against Oxford University in the 2014 University Match at Oxford. Batting once in the match, he was dismissed for 29 runs in the Cambridge first innings by Abidine Sakande. In the Oxford first innings he took a five wicket haul with his fast-medium bowling, with figures of 5 for 73. He followed this up in their second innings with figures of 3 for 49.

References

External links

1989 births
Living people
People from Grantham
People educated at The King's School, Grantham
Alumni of Homerton College, Cambridge
English cricketers
Cambridge University cricketers